"U Know What's Up" is a song by American R&B singer Donell Jones. It was written by Edward "Eddie F." Ferrell, Darren Lighty, Clifton Lighty, Balewa Muhammad, Anthony Hamilton, Clifford Harris, and Veronica McKenzie for his second studio album, Where I Wanna Be (1999), while production was helmed by Ferrell and Darren Lighty for Untouchables Entertainment.

Released as the album's lead single, the song became Jones' biggest hit, reaching the top 10 in Ireland and on the US Billboard Hot 100. The song was most successful in the United Kingdom, where it peaked at number two on the UK Singles Chart. In addition, "U Know What's Up" topped Billboards Hot R&B/Hip-Hop Songs for eight consecutive weeks, his only single to do so to date. A remix version featuring Left Eye of TLC was used for the accompanying music video.

Music video
The video features rapper Left Eye of TLC, YoungBloodZ, T.I., Usher and Big Boi of OutKast, all of whom were (including Jones) part of the LaFace Records label. At the beginning of the video, there is a sign that says La Face Place, in reference to the record label. The clip premiered on BET on the week ending September 12, 1999.

The video begins with Left Eye at her apartment receiving a phone call, presumably from Jones, informing her that the music video for the song is being aired on TV. She turns to the TV screen behind her playing the video, which shows Jones at a hotel party, and proceeds to watch it. As it turns out, Left Eye is not the only person watching the video, as the video pans across the building showing Usher and his girlfriend at his apartment, and Big Boi hosting a music video premiere at his apartment. Midway through the video, Left Eye leaves her apartment and recites her verse in the song while walking across the corridor, presumably to join Jones at a similar party at the back of the building, which is revealed as the camera pulls back from the corridor. At the end, the video pulls back to reveal Jones watching it at his apartment with his girlfriend.

Track listings

US CD and cassette single
 "U Know What's Up" (album version) – 4:02
 "Shorty (Got Her Eyes on Me)" (excerpt) – 2:05
 Album snippets – 5:46

US 12-inch single
A1. "U Know What's Up" (clean version edit) – 4:02
A2. "U Know What's Up" (instrumental) – 4:02
A3. "U Know What's Up" (clean acapella) – 3:45
B1. "U Know What's Up" (clean version) – 4:02
B2. "U Know What's Up" (album version) – 4:02
B3. "U Know What's Up" (dirty version) – 4:02

Australian CD single
 "U Know What's Up" (clean version) – 4:02
 "U Know What's Up" (album version featuring Left Eye) – 4:03
 "U Know What's Up" (instrumental) – 4:02
 Album snippets – 5:46

UK CD1
 "U Know What's Up" (album version) – 4:01
 "U Know What's Up" (album version featuring Left Eye) – 4:03
 "U Know What's Up" (video version) – 3:55

UK CD2
 "U Know What's Up" (Jeremy B radio edit) – 3:36
 "U Know What's Up" (Jeremy B main mix) – 7:04
 "U Know What's Up" (Jeremy B The Edge dub) – 7:20

UK 12-inch single
A1. "U Know What's Up" (Jeremy B main mix) – 7:04
A2. "U Know What's Up" (Jeremy B main instrumental) – 7:04
B1. "U Know What's Up" (Jeremy B The Edge dub) – 7:20
B2. "U Know What's Up" (album version) – 4:03

UK cassette single and European CD single
 "U Know What's Up" (album version featuring Left Eye) – 4:03
 "U Know What's Up" (Jeremy B radio edit) – 3:36

Charts

Weekly charts

Year-end charts

Certifications

Release history

See also
 R&B number-one hits of 1999 (USA)
 R&B number-one hits of 2000 (USA)

References

1999 songs
1999 singles
Arista Records singles
Donell Jones songs
LaFace Records singles
Lisa Lopes songs
Songs written by Lisa Lopes
Songs written by Balewa Muhammad